Lin-ay sang Negros 2016, the 22nd edition of the annual Lin-ay sang Negros pageant was held on April 18, 2016 at the Pana-ad Stadium. A total of 11 cities and 12 municipalities sent their representatives. Lin-ay sang Negros 2015 winner Jessica Zevenbergen of San Carlos City, crowned her successor Alyssa Jimenea of Victorias at the end of the event. This is the first time the pageant is held with the province no longer a part of Western Visayas but the Negros Island Region.

Final results

Contestants

Significant notes

Returns

Bacolod - last competed in 2014. After winning the title three years in a row, Bacolod decided not to send a representative in 2015 to give way to other cities and municipalities. 
Ilog - last competed in 2012
Pontevedra - hasn't been sending a representative in more than 10 years.
Sipalay - last competed in 2012

Post-Pageant Nottes
Louise Lian Enumerable joined Mutya ng Pilipinas NIR 2017 and was adjudged the winner.

Panel of judges

Hosts

Max Collins (Kapuso Star)
Benjamin Alves (Kapuso Star)

References

Beauty pageants in the Philippines
Culture of Negros Occidental
2016 beauty pageants
2016 in the Philippines